Zheng Tao is a Chinese football player who plays as a full-back.

Club career
Zheng Tao started his professional career with Inter Shanghai (now known as Shaanxi Neo-China Chanba F.C.) after graduating from their youth team in 2004. In his debut season he impressed many by quickly establishing himself within the team, eventually playing in 16 league games and seeing his team finish the league third. The following season would see him further establish himself by playing in 10 more games throughout the 2005 league season.

Inter Shanghai would move away from Shanghai to Xi'an City at the end of 2005 league season and rename themselves Shaanxi Neo-China Chanba F.C. however their move to a new city brought about much instability towards the team and their results reflected this, even seeing them flirt with relegation in the 2007 league season. Zheng Tao, has however been a  consistent regular within the team and despite a 2008 league season which saw him miss the majority of the season he has remained loyal to Shaanxi. In 2011, he moved to Liaoning Whowin.

On 4 January 2017, Zheng moved to fellow Super League side Chongqing Lifan.

Career statistics
Statistics accurate as of match played 31 December 2019.

References

External links
 
 Career player profile at sohu.com (Chinese)
 Player profile at Shaanxi Chanba website (Chinese)

1985 births
Living people
Chinese footballers
Footballers from Dalian
Beijing Renhe F.C. players
Liaoning F.C. players
Chongqing Liangjiang Athletic F.C. players
Chinese Super League players
Association football defenders